Leon County is the name of two counties in the United States:

Leon County, Florida
Leon County, Texas

See also
Viscounty of Léon in Brittany in northwestern France